Harrison Grist Mill, also known as Morley Grist Mill, is a historic grist mill located at Morley in St. Lawrence County, New York. It was built about 1840 and is a rectangular random ashlar, cut sandstone building with a simple gable roof.

It was listed on the National Register of Historic Places in 1982.

References

Grinding mills on the National Register of Historic Places in New York (state)
Industrial buildings completed in 1840
Buildings and structures in St. Lawrence County, New York
Grinding mills in New York (state)
National Register of Historic Places in St. Lawrence County, New York
1840 establishments in New York (state)